Duke of Buccleugh was an East Indiaman launched in 1831. She made one voyage for the British East India Company (EIC) and then traded between England and India until she was lost in February 1840.

EIC voyage (1831–1832): The EIC chartered on 29 April 1831 for £8 9s per ton for a voyage to Bengal and return. Captain Alexander Henning sailed from the Downs on 10 June. Duke of Buccleugh reached Madras on 22 September, and arrived at Calcutta on 10 October. Homeward bound, she was at Madras on 18 January 1832 and the Cape on 10 March. She reached St Helena on 30 March and arrived back at her moorings on 8 May.

From 1832 to 1840 Duke of Buccleugh was in private trade to India.

Fate: Duke of Buccleugh, McCloud, master, was wrecked on 7 February 1840 on Point Palmyras Reef. She was carrying 74 recruits, five women, and one child; one of the recruits died.  rescued the survivors. Duke of Buccleuch was on a voyage from London to Calcutta.

Citations and references
Citations

References
 
 

1831 ships
Ships of the British East India Company
Age of Sail merchant ships of England
Maritime incidents in 1840